Roquefortine C is a mycotoxin that belongs to a class of naturally occurring 2,5-diketopiperazines produced by various fungi, particularly species from the genus Penicillium. It was first isolated from a strain of Penicillium roqueforti, a species commercially used as a source of proteolytic and lipolytic enzymes during maturation of the blue-veined cheeses, Roquefort, Danish Blue, Stilton and Gorgonzola.

Roquefortine C is a cyclodipeptide mycotoxin derived from the diketopiperazine cyclo(Trp-dehydro-His) and is a relatively common fungal metabolite produced by a number of Penicillium species. It is also considered one of the most important fungal contaminants of carbonated beverages, beer, wine, meats, cheese and bread. At high doses roquefortine C is classified as a toxic compound. Although it is a potent neurotoxin at high doses, at low concentrations of 0.05 to 1.47 mg/kg that occur in domestic cheeses, it was found to be "safe for the consumer". The mechanisms underlying its toxicity and metabolism have been investigated by studying its interaction with mammalian cytochrome P450 enzymes. In addition to these toxic properties, roquefortine C  reportedly possesses bacteriostatic activity against gram-positive bacteria, but only in those organisms containing haemoproteins.

Roquefortine C contains the unusual E-dehydrohistidine moiety, a system that typically undergoes facile isomerization under acidic, basic, or photochemical conditions to isoroquefortine C, the 3,12 double-bond Z-isomer of roquefortine C. 

However isoroquefortine C is not a natural product and in contrast to roquefortine C does not bind iron.  Both have been synthesised.

Related compounds 
 Aristolochene
 Aflatoxin
 Patulin

References

External links
 Roquefortine C on https://www.scbt.com

Mycotoxins
Penicillium
Imidazoles
Lactams
Nitrogen heterocycles
Diketopiperazines